Stenotelus is a genus of beetles in the family Carabidae, containing the following species:

 Stenotelus opacus Bouchard, 1903
 Stenotelus piceus Louwerens, 1952
 Stenotelus spinosus Darlington, 1968

References

Lebiinae